The 2013–14 Slovenian PrvaLiga was the 23rd edition of the Slovenian PrvaLiga since its establishment in 1991. Also known by the abbreviation 1. SNL, PrvaLiga was contested by the top ten clubs in Slovenia, for the title of national champions. The fixture schedule was released on 28 June 2013. The season began on 13 July 2013 and ended on 25 May 2014.

Maribor were the defending champions, having won their 11th league title the previous season. The season featured eight teams from the 2012–13 Slovenian PrvaLiga and two teams from the 2012–13 Slovenian Second League, Zavrč, who was promoted directly as the winners of the second division and Krka, which was promoted as a third placed team. The worst placed team during the 2012–13 season, Aluminij, was demoted to the Slovenian Second League, while Mura 05 was denied a license by the Slovenian Football Association, due to the club's poor financial state, and in the following weeks they subsequently filed for bankruptcy and folded.

Stadiums and locations

1Seating capacity only. Some stadiums (e.g. Krka, Rudar, Zavrč) also have standing areas.

League table

Results

First half of the season

Second half of the season

Relegation play-offs

Krka, who finished in ninth place in the league, were due to play (over two legs) against Radomlje, who finished in second place in the 2013–14 Slovenian Second League. However, Dob, the winners of the 2013–14 Slovenian Second League, rejected their promotion. Therefore, Radomlje claimed automatic promotion to the 2014–15 Slovenian PrvaLiga and the relegation play-off was cancelled, with Krka remaining in the top division.

Top goalscorers

Source: PrvaLiga

Attendance

See also
2013 Slovenian Supercup
2013–14 Slovenian Cup
2013–14 Slovenian Second League

References
General

Specific

External links
 
Soccerway profile

Slovenian PrvaLiga seasons
Slovenian PrvaLiga
1